This is a list of Buddhist temples, monasteries, stupas, and pagodas in Bangladesh for which there are Wikipedia articles.

Temples
 Buddha Dhatu Jadi
 Kamalapur Dharmarajika Bauddha Vihara
 Misripara Seema Buddha Bihar

Archaeological sites
 Jagaddala Mahavihara
 Shalban Vihara
 Shita Coat Bihar
 Somapura Mahavihara
 Vasu Vihara

See also
Buddhism in Bangladesh
Bengali Buddhists
Madhu Purnima (Honey Full Moon Festival)
Barua Buddhist Institutes in India and Bangladesh
Bangladesh Bauddha Kristi Prachar Sangha
Chittagong Pali College
Bangladesh Sanskrit and Pali Education Board
List of Buddhist temples

Notes

External links

 BuddhaNet's Comprehensive Directory of Buddhist Temples sorted by country
 Buddhactivity Dharma Centres database

 
 
Bangladesh
Buddhist temples